Obolon is an Eastern European name for floodplain meadows.

 Obolon, Kyiv (Оболонь) is a historical locality and a suburb of Ukraine's capital Kyiv

Next objects' names are derived from the name of Sviatoshyn neighbourhood:
It may refer to:

 Obolon Raion, a district of Ukraine's capital city, Kyiv
 Obolon, the largest Ukrainian brewer
 FC Obolon Kyiv, a defunct soccer club based in Kyiv
 Obolon (Kyiv Metro), a metro station

See also 
 Obolon' crater, a meteorite impact crater in Ukraine